The Masonic Temple is a historic structure in Springfield, Ohio, United States.  Located along High Street in downtown Springfield, the temple was designed by Howard Dwight Smith and the firm of Miller & Reeves.  Local Freemasons have met at the temple since construction was finished in 1927.

The temple was added to the National Register of Historic Places in 2008.  In nominating the temple for inclusion on the Register, the Ohio Historical Society highlighted its significance as the home of the oldest fraternal organization in Springfield.

References

External links
 from the Ohio Historical Society

Masonic buildings completed in 1927
Masonic buildings in Ohio
Clubhouses on the National Register of Historic Places in Ohio
Buildings and structures in Springfield, Ohio
National Register of Historic Places in Clark County, Ohio